Coachella is a music festival organized by the Los Angeles-based concert promoter Goldenvoice (a subsidiary of AEG Live). It takes place annually at the Empire Polo Club in Indio, California. The event is known for its large art pieces and cutting-edge artists' performances.

Line-ups
All information taken from various sources. Headline performers are listed in Boldface.

1999
Saturday, October 9

Sunday, October 10

DJs playing between every Main Stage act: DJ Liquid Todd, DJ Raymond Roker, DJ Kid Koala, Bud Brothers, DJ Carbo, DJ Jason Bentley, DJ Jun

2001
Saturday, April 28

Nortec Collective also played that year

Art from 2001 was contributed by Joe Mangrum.

2002
Saturday, April 27

Sunday, April 28

Tenacious D performed a surprise guest set before Foo Fighters and Beck performed a surprise guest set after Z-Trip.

2003
Saturday, April 26

Sunday, April 27

Dropped Acts: Division of Laura Lee

In 2003, Installation Art contributions came from: Cauac-Syd Klinge, Corndog and the Chaplain of Sparceland—Chunks, Nair B & Lovely, Magic Glasses, Facility 3 Artists and Joe Mangrum, Space Cowboys, Madagascar, 1Sky's HypKnowTron, Howard Hollis+Max Miceli, Christian Ristow, Bio-Fuel Bus, Joe Bard & Danya Parkinson, Finley Fryer, Buckethead, Mutaytor, String Theory Arcadian Circle. The art was curated by Philip Blaine.

2004
Saturday, May 1

Sunday, May 2

Dropped Acts: The Future Sound of London, Jimmy Eat World, and Wilco

The 2004 Installation Artists were: Syd Klinge (Cauac Tesla Coil), Nairb (Deus Ex Machina), Laura Crosta and Funn Roberts (Lanternaria), LT Mustardseed (The Journey of the Dragonfly), Finley Fryer ("Stan" – The Diver), Rosanna Scimecca (Cleavage in Space+Red Widow Spider), Christian Ristow (Robochrist Industries), David Wharton + Scott Mattison (Diffraction Light Tunnel), Howard Hollis (Linticular 3-D Art), Scott Gasparian (gaspo) (HypKnowTron), D-light (Helix IV), Gabi Tuschak, Juli Gudmundson and Melody Byrd (Chitlin'n Grits), Mass Ensemble (Earth Harp), Jerico Woggon (Year of the Snake) and Cyclecide (Bike Rodeo). Philip Blaine curated the art.

2005
Saturday, April 30

Sunday, May 1

The Do LaB: Jupit3r, Todd Spero

Dropped Acts: Cocteau Twins, Doves
Installation Art :: Curated by Philip Blaine

2006
Saturday, April 29

Sunday, April 30

Chris Liberator and Kristina Sky also played that year at Oasis Dome

Dropped Acts: Hard-Fi and The Subways

The 2006 installation artists were: Syd Klinge (Cauac), Brian Corndog (Metron Transformer), Michael Christian (Flock and Hypha), Rosanna Scimecca (Zephyrus' Disgolmerate), Jerico Woggon, Orion Fredricks (Harmonizer Water Sculpture), Doyle (The Spider), Cyclecide/Bike Rodeo, O2 Creative (Gnome Dome), The Do LaB (Lucent Misting Oasis featuring Lucent Dossier Experience,) and Keith Greco (Leaf Rake Tree+Snow Globe Domes, Hotshot the Robot, Philip Blaine curated.

2007
Friday, April 27

Dome: Junglist Platoon/Respect featuring: Machete, Scooba, Clutch, No Face & Drone, Kraak & Smaak, David J, Marques Wyatt, Jacob Thiele (of The Faint), Travis Keller

The Do LaB: Lucent Dossier Experience, Jesse Wright, Sammy Bliss, Helios Jive, DJ Imagika, Nalepa

Saturday, April 28

Dome: Bassrush featuring: Silver, Hazen, XXXL, Subflo, MC Dino & Question Mark, Lady Miss Kier, Andy Rourke, Daniel Ash, Eugene, Carla and Greg (of Autolux), The Professionals

The Do LaB: Lucent Dossier Experience, Bassnectar, Jupit3r, Dandelion, David Starfire, Metamorphs, Nick the Neck, The Ianator

Sunday, April 29

Dome: Adam Freeland, Total Science, Paul Harding (of Pendulum), Cut Chemist, Kevin Haskins, Busy P & DJ Mehdi, Frankie Chan

The Do LaB: Lucent Dossier Experience, Helios Jive, Marty, Jok Ton, The Ianator

Dropped Acts: We Are Scientists

Art for 2007 included: The Do LaB, Lucent Dossier Experience, Johnny America, Syd Klinge: Tesla Coil, Brian Corndog: KA Labyrinth, Mark Lottor: Cubatron, Cyclecide Bike Rodeo, Kinetic Steam Works, Jamie Vaida: Goes Around Comes Around Carousel, Stronghold Productions: FirePod, Michael Christian: I.T., and Babel, Sean Sobczak: Love and Dragons, Domes Guys: 90' Dome, Jason Hackenworth: Megamite Army, Dorothy Trojanowski: Rubber Horses, Perpetual Art Machine, NON Designs, Mark Esper: It's in the Air and Enlightenment, Brose Partington: Tide, Greg de Gouveia: Cubed []3, Jim Bowers: Terrasphere, Hotshot the Robot, LT Mustardseed: Aquatic Temple of Chill, Stefano Corazza: Field of Sunflower Robots, Sasstown Crew (Portland): Threemove, Rosanna Scimeca: St. Taudry's, manIC. Philip Blaine curated.

2008
Friday, April 25

The Do LaB: Lucent Dossier Experience, The Ianator, Sammy Bliss, Jesse Wright, DJ Wolfie, Djun Djun, Henry Strange, Geno Cochino, Chad Rock

Saturday, April 26

The Do LaB: Lucent Dossier Experience, The Glitch Mob, Random Rab, David Starfire with iCatching, Jesse (of Brazilian Girls), Dandelion, DJ Imagika, Adam Ohana

Sunday, April 27

The Do LaB: Lucent Dossier Experience, Adam Freeland, Jupit3r, Patricio, Oscure, El Papa Chango, Helios Jive, Ana Sia, Saynt

Dropped Acts: Jamie T, Madness, New Young Pony Club, The Bees, The Horrors, The Streets, Turbonegro

Portishead were planned to headline the festival, but were demoted to playing before Prince's set.

In 2008, art was contributed by Gerard Minakawa: (Bamboo Waves), The Do Lab: (Oasis), Sean Orlando: (The Steampunk Treehouse), Mike Ross: (BigRigJig), Mark Lottor: (The Quad Cubatron), Ball-Nogues Studio: (Copper Droopscape), Martii Kalliala and Jenna Sutela: (Super Ball), Aaron Koblin: (Flight Patterns), Michael Christian: (Beyond the Garden), Christopher Janney: (Sonic Forest), Syd Klinge: (Cauac Twins), Corndog: (Parabola), James Nick Sears: (The Orb), Orion Fredericks: (Fata Morgana) HotShot the Robot, SWARM and Slick.  Philip Blaine curated.

2009
Friday, April 17

The Do LaB: VibeSquaD, Lucent Dossier Experience, The Ianator, Jesse Wright, Kether, DJ Wolfie, Dub Science

The Dome. Ed Banger Records Presents: Free DOME of Speech: Busy P, DJ Mehdi, Kim of The Presets, Peanut Butter Wolf, Steve Aoki, Friendly Fires (DJ Set)

Saturday, April 18

The Do LaB: Lucent Dossier Experience, Sub Swara, Beats Antique, MiM0SA, Patricio, El Papa Chango, Helios Jive, RD, Pod

The Dome. Pure Filth Presents: Soundclash in the Desert: Flying Lotus, Kode9, Daedelus, Bomb Squad, The Professionals & 6 Blocc, Daddy Kev, Nobody & Nocando, The Gaslamp Killer & DLX, Ras G & Samiyam

Sunday, April 19

The Do LaB: Lucent Dossier Experience, BLVD, Random Rab, Jupit3r, Marty Party, QUIET, David Starfire w/ iCatching, Imagika, Braden, Henrey Strange

The Dome. 1107 Presents: LA Riots, Felix Cartal, Treasure Island, AC Slater, Joker of the Scene, Jokers of the Scene, Paparazzi, Kill the Noise, Franki Chan

Dropped Acts: Amy Winehouse, Hercules and Love Affair

In 2009, art was contributed by: The Do Lab's Lucent Mysting Oasis and Lucent Dossier Experience, Gerard Minakawa: (Bamboo Starscraper), Flaming Lotus Girls: (Serpent Mother), Rob Bucholz: (Perhaps) Hotshot the Robot: (Spectralcodec Interactive Video), CalPoly Pomona Architectural students+Michael Fox: (Flockwall), Shrine + Spears family: (La Familia Divina - Shrine), False Profits Labs: (Pyrocardium), Michael Christian: (Sphae), Ball-Nogues Studio (Benjamin Ball+Gaston Nogues+Andrew Lyon and Philip Blaine and SCI Arc Students): (Elastic Plastic Sponge), Rimski: (Rimski's Bicycle Piano), Christian Ristow: (Hand of Man), Mark Lottor: (The Quad Cubatron), Alex Nolan and Justin Grant: (SOL), Syd Klinge: (Cauac Twins).  Philip Blaine curated.

2010
Thursday, April 15 | 1107 Events Presents: Matinée Sessions in the Camgrounds: Jokers of the Scene, Le Castle Vania, 12th Planet, Toy Selectah, Franki Chan, Matinee Resident All Stars featuring: Paparazzi, Joaquin, Sir Charles

Friday, April 16

The Do LaB: Lucent Dossier Experience, KRADDY, R/D, Jesse Wright, Sammy Bliss, The Ianator, Pod

Heineken Dome: DJ Tre – Special Session: Coachella's first Silent Disco, Andy Caldwell, Classixx, Eskmo, Fred Everything, J-Boogie vs. DJ Eleven, David Arevalo

Coachella & Pure Filth Present: BASSFACE, Camping Sessions: Mary Anne Hobbs, Daedelus, The Gaslamp Killer, Nobody, Sam XL, Ras G & Samiyam, Nocando. Visuals by Dr. Strangeloop

Saturday, April 17

The Do LaB: Beats Antique, Eskmo, Lucent Dossier Experience, Jupit3r, Oscure, LYNX & Janover, Patricio, Deru, The Ianator

Heineken Dome: VJ/DJ Kris P – Special Session: Coachella's first Silent Disco, Milo/Vello, David Carvahlo, David Starfire featuring MC iCatching, Nisus, Franky Boissy, Isaiah Martin featuring Dustin on Brass, Behrouz, Bunny (of Rabbit in the Moon)

Coachella & Pure Filth Present: BASSFACE, Camping Sessions: Seven (filled the spot after Flylo's cancellation), Jakes, The Professionals, Take, Free the Robots, Deco & DLX, MC Kemst Visuals by Dr. Strangeloop

Sunday, April 18

The Do LaB: Lucent Dossier Experience, MiM0SA, Random Rab, Siren, Welder, Patricio

Heineken Dome: VJ/DJ Kris P – Special Session: Coachella's first Silent Disco, Donald Glaude, Brion Topolski, Jamie Schwabl, Kris P, DJ Frances, Freddy Be, Kazell

Dropped Acts: Grace Jones, Hadouken!, Mew

2011
Friday, April 15

The Do LaB: Lucent Dossier Experience, Freq Nasty, KRADDY, Jupit3r, La' Reda, Govinda, SaQi, RLS, Michele Bass, GoldRush

Saturday, April 16

The Do LaB: An-Ten-Nae, Lucent Dossier Experience, NitGrit, Emancipator, Ana Sia, Patricio, Jesse Wright & Lee Burridge, Sammy Bliss, The Ianator

Jeff Goldblum performed an unannounced jazz set in the campgrounds in the afternoon.

Sunday, April 17

The Do LaB: Lucent Dossier Experience, Paper Diamond, R/D, Stephan Jacobs, Sugarpill, Siren, Gladkill, Timonkey, Karim So

Dropped Acts: Clare Maguire, Fat Freddy's Drop, Gypsy & the Cat, Klaxons

In 2011, art was contributed by: The Do Lab Oasis and Lucent Dossier Experience, The Creators Project: Coachella Stage Enhanced, Sarah Tent Installation, Long March, Punch, Nidhogg, The Do Lab, The Do Lab's Pagoda, Winwin Creative: Joy, Michael Christian: Candelaphytes, Hotshot the Robot, Cyclecide Bike Rodeo, reel-Mobile, Coachella Art Studios, Rob Buchholz: Wish, Todd Williams: Land Sharks, Syd Klinge: (CauacTwins), Christian Ristow: Fledgling, Balloon Chain, A Physical Manifestation of Ladies and Gentlemen We Are Floating in Space: Jonathan Glazer + J. Spaceman with Undisclosable and One of Us.

2012
Friday, April 13 & 20

The Do LaB Weekend 1: Lucent Dossier Experience, Stephan Jacobs, Sugarpill, Jupit3r, Gladkill, Russ Liquid, GoldRush, CrisB., Jobot, Patricio

The Do LaB Weekend 2: Lucent Dossier Experience, Jupit3r, Patricio, Jeremy Sole, Marley Carroll, Geno Cochino, Natasha Kmeto, Quade

Heineken Dome Weekend 1: EC Twins, Andy Caldwell, Hot Mouth, Zen Freeman, La' Reda

Heineken Dome Weekend 2: Roy Davis Jr. featuring J. Noize (live), David Harness, Marques Wyatt, J Paul Getto, Cappa Regime

Saturday, April 14 & 21

The Do LaB Weekend 1: Patricio, Lucent Dossier Experience, Two Fingers, Machine Drum, Pumpkin, Christian Martin, Worthy, iDiot Savant, Sammy Bliss

The Do LaB Weekend 2: Empire Strikes Back!, Lucent Dossier Experience, Lowriderz, Sidecar Tommy, Shawna, David Satori, SaQi, ill-esha

Heineken Dome Weekend 1: Starkillers featuring. Dmitry Ko, Droog, Fernando Garibay, John Beaver, Team No Sleep

Heineken Dome Weekend 2: Donald Glaude, Audrey Napoleon, Save the Robot, Colette, Ranidu Lankage, Siren

Sunday, April 15 & 22

The Do LaB Weekend 1: Empire Strikes Back!, Lucent Dossier Experience, KRADDY, NastyNasty, R/D, David Starfire, NitGrit, Salva, Deru, Inspired Flight, Hopscotch

The Do LaB Weekend 2: Lucent Dossier Experience, Minnesota, Live & Light, LYNX, Griz, Imagika, oscure, Dov, Ruff Hauser

Heineken Dome Weekend 1: Mike Balance, Late Night Sneaky (live) White Noize, DJ Dan, Mike Balance

Heineken Dome Weekend 2: Doc Martin featuring Sublevel (live), Gene Hunt, Wally Callerio, Barry Weaver, Dusty Carter

Dropped Acts: Cat Power, La Roux, The Midnight Beast, Black Sabbath

In 2012, art was contributed by The Do LaB: (Oasis) + (Triad), Lucent Dossier Experience, Coachella Art Studios, Charles Gadeken: (WAVE), Todd Williams: (Land Shark), Gerard Minakawa: (Starry Bamboo), Hotshot the Robot, Susan Robb: (Warmth, Giant Black Tubes), Christian Ristow: (Garaplata), Shrine: (Shacks), Robert Bose: (Balloon Chain), Sensory Sync: (Gateway), Poetic Kinetic: (Solitary Inflorescence), Cyclecide and Makeover Mechanix.

2013
Friday, April 12 & 19

The Do LaB Weekend 1: Goldrush, Lucent Dossier Experience, Run DMT, R/D, Robotic Pirate Monkey, Unlimited Gravity, G Jones, Manic Focus, Jupit3r, Hunterleggitt

The Do LaB Weekend 2: Kastle, Lucent Dossier Experience, Kraddy, Jupit3r, Stephan Jacobs, Sugarpill, Metaphase, Astronautica

Heineken Dome Weekend 1: Kenny "Dope" Gonzalez, DJ Spen, Acid Face, Sex Panther, David Paul

Heineken Dome Weekend 2: Gene Farris, Sonny Fodera, J. Phlip, Ale Rauen (b2b) Rodrigo Vieira, Lexal

Saturday, April 13 & 20

The Do LaB Weekend 1: Sammy Bliss, Idiot Savant, Lucent Dossier Experience, Jeremy Sole, Marques Wyatt, Orchard Lounge, POD

The Do LaB Weekend 2: Russ Liquid, Jobot, Lucent Dossier Experience, Black 22's, Pumpkin, Patricio, Hunterleggit, Pickles

Heineken Dome Weekend 1: DJ Pierre, Gene Hunt, Whitenoize, Alain Octavio, Sleight of Hands, Deron

Heineken Dome Weekend 2: Mark Farina, Roy Davis, Jr., Donald Glaude, Tim Mason, Ivan Ruiz

Sunday, April 14 & 21

 Dub FX playing at the 10:25PM at The Do Lab (Weekend 1)

The Do LaB Weekend 1: Sammy Bliss, Idiot Savant, Lucent Dossier Experience, Jeremy Sole, Marques Wyatt, Orchard Lounge, POD

The Do LaB Weekend 2: Thugfucker, Worthy, Lucent Dossier Experience, J. Phlip, Christian Martin, Nick Monaco, Jason Burns

Heineken Dome Weekend 1: DJ Sneak (b2b) Doc Martin, DJ Dan, Mike Balance, Buds not Bombs, Elz

Heineken Dome Weekend 2: Stanton Warriors, Lazy Rich, Dzeko & Torres, Cappa Regime, Carlos Alfonzo

Dropped Acts: Unicorn Kid, Lou Reed

In 2013, art contributions included: The Power Station by Derek Doublin, Vanessa Bonet and Chris Wagganer, Helix Poeticus (The Snail) by Poetic Kinetics, Los Angeles. CAUC Twins by Syd Klinge, Los Angeles. Recyclosauras Rex by Johny Amerika, Los Angeles. Mirage by Paul Clemente, Los Angeles. PK-107 Mantis by Poetic Kinetics, Los Angeles.

2014
Friday, April 11 & 18

The Do LaB Weekend 1: Minnesota vs. G Jones, Sound Remedy, Lucent Dossier Experience, Lowriderz, Gladkill, K Theory, Supervision, Thriftworks, Paul Basic

The Do LaB Weekend 2: Thugfucker, DJ Tennis, Idiot Savant, Lucent Dossier Experience, Kidnap Kid, Isaac Tichauer, Perseus, Moonboots, Henry Krinkle, Jobot

Heineken House Weekend 1: Last Call, Mike Will Made It, Solomun, Sneaky Sound System, Team Supreme, Eric Sharp

Heineken House Weekend 2: Carnage & Guests, Surprise Guest, Mike Will Made It, Escort, Kingdom x Nguzunguzu, Team Supreme, Sean Glass

Saturday, April 12 & 19

The Do LaB Weekend 1: Totally Enormous Extinct Dinosaurs, Kastle, Rone, Sébastien Léger, Justin Martin, Gorgon City, Christian Martin, J.Phlip, Worthy, Sammy Bliss

The Do LaB Weekend 2: Odesza, Kraddy, Swear Beats, Benji Vaughn, Blond:ish, Patricio, Eduardo Castillo, Mikey Lion, Lafa Taylor

Heineken House Weekend 1: Last Call, The Gaslamp Killer vs. Thundercat, Nosaj Thing, Alvin Risk, Valentino Khan, Hundred Waters, Heartsrevolution, Anna Lunoe, Franki Chan

Heineken House Weekend 2: GZA with Gaslamp Killer, Gaslamp Killer & Thundercat, UZ & Surprise Guest, Anabel Englund x Human Life, Escort with Guests, Chela, Anna Lunoe, Franki Chan

Sunday, April 13 & 20

The Do LaB Weekend 1: Kill Paris, Sugarpill, Dimond Saints, Slow Magic, ill-esha, Chrime Sparks, El Papa Chango, Two Fresh, Vokab Kompany & Crush Effect, Dessert Dwellers

The Do LaB Weekend 2: Mitis, Opiuo, Freddy Todd, Jupit3r, Love & Light, Chris B, Hunterleggit, Hopscotch, Ruff Hauser

Heineken House Weekend 1: Last Call, Flight Facilities, Chela, MDNR, Femme, Sean Glass x Goddollars

Heineken House Weekend 2: Classixx (DJ), Escort with MNDR, Surprise Guest, Flight Facilities, Preservation Hall Jazz Band, Surprise Guest, MDNR, Femme, Sean Glass

Dropped Acts: Beady Eye

In 2014, art contributions included: 2Squared by Charles Gadeken; Balloon Chain by Robert Bose; Becoming Human by Christian Ristow; Cryochome by James Peterson; The Do Lab by Eepert Village; Escape Velocity (The Astronaut) by Poetic Kinetics; Smartbird by Festo; Giant Green Caterpillar by Mike Grandaw; Lightweaver by Stereo-Bot; Lucent Dossier Experience; Reflection Field by Philip K. Smith III; Archetypes by Keith Greco; Archetypes by Brent Spears/Shrine; Sidewinder by Abigail Portner; Paraiso by Raices Cultura; Road Trip by Don Kennel; Intentcity by Teale Hatheway; The Jive Joint; and Coachella Art Studios.

2015
Friday, April 10 & 17

The Do LaB Weekend 1: Loudpvck, Jackal, Fort Knox Five, Lucent Dossier Experience, Lane 8, Jesse Wright, Mihkal, Dirtwire, B.R.E.E.D., Clozee

The Do LaB Weekend 2: Gorgon City DJ set, Dr. Fresch, My Favorite Robot, Lucent Dossier Experience, Mija, Atish, Lisbona, Sabo, Patricio & Shawni, Whitehorse

Heineken House Weekend 1: Hot Dub Time Machine, Rome Fortune, A-Trak, Keys N Krates, Gladiator, Bosco, Athletixx, Nick Catchdubs, Craze

Heineken House Weekend 2: Hot Dub Time Machine, Keys N Krates, Treasure Fingers, Bosco, Athletixx, Gladiator, Craze, Nick Catchdubs

Saturday, April 11 & 18

The Do LaB Weekend 1: Ooah, Russ Liquid, Falcons, Joe Kay X Jay Prince, An-Ten-Nae, Droog, Sébastien Léger, Justin Jay, Addatap

The Do LaB Weekend 2: Adam Freeland, Kraddy, A Tribe Called Red, CRNKN, Redux, Hoodboi, Robot Koch, Goldrush, TASTYTREAT, Tropicool, Andrew Luce

Heineken House Weekend 1: Questlove, Vice, Peanut Butter Wolf, Cassian B2B Light Year, Hot Tub Time Machine, Sosupersam

Heineken House Weekend 2: Hot Dub Time Machine, Sir Mix-a-Lot, Vice, Peanut Butter Wolf, Cassian B2B Light Year, SOSUPERSAM

Sunday, April 12 & 19

The Do LaB Weekend 1: Bonobo, M.A.N.D.Y., Edu Imbernon, Till von Sein, Coyote Kisses, Jai Wolf, Hayden James, Bit Funk, Cassian

The Do LaB Weekend 2: Chet Faker DJ set, J.Phlip, Worthy, Pomo, Tokimonsta, Dance Spirit, Louis Futton, Morillo, Hunter Leggit, Clozee

Heineken House Weekend 1: Doc Martin, Jillionaire, Machel Montano, Grandtheft, Hot Dub Time Machine, Willem Wolfe, Richie Beretta

Heineken House Weekend 2: Hot Dub Time Machine, Jillionaire with Bunji Garlin & Fay-Ann Lyons, Jillionaire, TWRK, Ape Drums, Richie Beretta

Dropped Acts: Kele, Dubfire

In 2015, art contributions included: Papilio Merraculous by Poetic Kinetics; Do LaB by Big Fish; Balloon Chain by Robert Bose; Party God by the Haas Brothers; Big Bear by Don Kennell; Praxis by Ben Zamora and John Zamora; Pulp Pavilion by Ball-Nogues Studio; the Corporate Headquarters by Derek Doublin and Vanessa Bonet; Earthmover by Christian Ristow; the Jive Joint by Super Tall Paul & Rossome; Big Horn Place by Shrine & Joel Dean Stockdill; Pulp Pavilion by Ball-Nogues Studio; Coachella Bound by Raices Cultura; Twelve Shades of Pass.ani by Keith Greco; Lighthouse by Randy Polumbo; Chrono Chromatic by Aphidoidea; and Coachella Art Studios.

2016
Friday, April 15 & 22

The Do LaB Weekend 1: What So Not, Speaker of the House, KRNE, Ghastly, Wave Racer, Stylust Beats, JayKode, Everyman, Dreamers Delight, Mountain of Youth

The Do LaB Weekend 2: Hippie Sabotage, Sweater Beats, Stwo,  Sam Gellaitry, Ekali, Autograf (DJ set), Gilligan Moss, Nico Luminous, The Human Experience

Heineken House Weekend 1: DJ Jayceeoh, Doctor P, Crizzly, Green Lantern, Kayzo, CRNKN, Protohype, UFO!

Heineken House Weekend 2: DJ Jayceeoh, Doctor P, Ookay, Protohype, Kayzo, Green Lantern, CRNKN, UFO!

Saturday, April 16 & 23

The Do LaB Weekend 1: The Glitch Mob, PANTyRAiD, Paper Diamond, Brillz, San Holo, Big Wild, Jerry Folk, The Funk Hunters, FDVM, Active Sun,

The Do LaB Weekend 2: Marc Kinchen, Claptone, Cut Snake, Hotel Garuda, Ardalan, Sacha Robotti, Walker & Royce, Patricio, Jesse Wright, Hunter Leggit

Heineken House Weekend 1: Warren G, Just Blaze, Too $hort, DJ Premier, Two Fresh, LONDONBRIDGE, TRAVISWILD

Heineken House Weekend 2: Just Blaze, Warren G, DJ Premier, Lookas, Two Fresh, LONDONBRIDGE, TRAVISWILD

Sunday, April 17 & 24

The Do LaB Weekend 1: Bob Moses (DJ set), Job Jobse, The Drifter, Lee Foss,  RÜFÜS DU SOL (DJ set), Le Youth, Humans, Imagined Herbal Flows, Dena Amy,

The Do LaB Weekend 2: Major Lazer, Kraddy, Stanton Warriors, Jason Bentley, NU, Bedouin, Satori, Öona Dahl, Shawni

Heineken House Weekend 1: Diplo & Friends, 4B, Brillz, Valentino Khan, ETC! ETC!, Bro Safari, Party Favor, Nina Las Vegas, FKi 1st, Paul Devro x Neo Fresco,

Heineken House Weekend 2: Party Favor, ETC! ETC!, Bro Safari, Nina Las Vegas, 4B, Valentino Khan, FKi 1st, Paul Devro x Neo Fresco

Plus: DESPACIO playing all weekend long

Dropped Acts: Nora En Pure

In 2016, art contributions included: Katrīna Neiburga and Andris Eglītis, Alex Arrechea, The Date Farmers, Phillip K Smith III, Jimenez Lai, R & R Studios, Robert Bose, Super Tall Paul & Rossome, Raices Cultura, Lucent Dossier

2017
Friday, April 14 & 21

The Do LaB Weekend 1: Louis the Child, Mr. Carmack, Haywyre, Bleep Bloop, The Gaslamp Killer, Sayer, Imbrsxulm Team B&L, PartyWave, Oscure

The Do LaB Weekend 2: Richie Hawtin, Jonas Rathsman, Classixx, Billy Kenny, Mad Zach, Barclay Crenshaw, Daktyl, Monte Booker, KNGSPRNGS

Heineken House: OWSLA takeover + Special Guests: Bone Thugs-n-Harmony, Grandmaster Flash (DJ set), DJ Quik, 4B*, Blaise James, Chris Lake, DJ Slink, Josh Pan**, Oshi, Whethan, Vindata

 Weekend 1 only (*)
 Weekend 2 only (**)

Saturday, April 15 & 22

The Do LaB Weekend 1: Tycho (DJ set), FKJ, Yotto, Eagles & BUtterflies, Monolink, Sabo, Surprise, Tara Brooks, Zimmer, Gone Gone Beyond

The Do LaB Weekend 2: Skrillex, Netsky, Liquid Stranger, EINMUSIK, Justin Martin, Will Clarke, the Geek x Vrv, The Librarian, HӒANA, Josh Billings & Nonfiction, divaDanielle

Heineken House: George Clinton & the Parliament Funkadelic*, Bixel Boys, BJ the Kid, Chuckie, Death**. DJ Nu Mark, Madds, Twrk**, Zaytoven

 Weekend 1 only (*)
 Weekend 2 only (**)

Sunday, April 16 & 23

The Do LaB Weekend 1: Autograf, Shiba San, *Amtrac, Space Jesus, Elohim, Whethan, Bearson, Chet Porter, BOGL

The Do LaB Weekend 2:  Rüfüs du Sol (DJ set), XXYYXX, Jan Blomqvist, Mikey Lion, Lee Reynolds, Marbs & Porkchop, Patricio, Lonely Boy, Jonnie King

Heineken House: NGHTMRE B2B Slander**, Armnhmr, Botnek, Eptic, JSTJR, Must Die!, Rickyxsan, Snavs, Special Guest

 Weekend 1 only (*)
 Weekend 2 only (**)

Plus: The Antarctic, an audio-visual sensory experience. All weekend long, starting on Thursday

In 2017, art contributions included: Chiaozza, Olalekan Jeyifous, Joanne Tatham and Tom O'Sullivan, Gustavo Prado

2018
Friday, April 13 & 20

On April 20, Kygo had special guest Ariana Grande during his set.

Saturday, April 14 & 21

Sunday, April 15 & 22

2019
Friday, April 12 & 19

Saturday, April 13 & 20

Dropped acts: Solange

Sunday, April 14 & 21

2020 (Canceled)
Coachella 2020 was canceled due to the ongoing COVID-19 pandemic in the United States.

2021 (Canceled)
Originally featuring a similar lineup from the previous year, Coachella 2021 was also cancelled due to continuing uncertainty regarding the pandemic.

2022
Friday, April 15 & 22

Saturday, April 16 & 23

Sunday, April 17 & 24

Rage Against the Machine and Travis Scott were originally featured as headliners, carrying over from the cancelled 2020 and 2021 events. Following the Astroworld Festival crowd crush in November 2021, Scott was removed as a headliner per request of a petition to remove him. Rage Against the Machine were also revealed to not be performing following the full lineup announcement in January 2022.
Kanye West (billed as “Ye”) was also previously set to headline, but dropped out on April 4, just 11 days before the start of the festival.
88rising made history as the first record label to showcase their roster at the festival. During the first weekend, Warren Hue, Milli, Bibi, Niki, Rich Brian, Hikaru Utada, Jackson Wang and CL performed during the set. Korean girl group 2NE1 reunited and gave their first performance since 2015. During the second weekend, Aespa, Yeek, Milli, August 8, Dumbfoundead, Rich Brian and Warren Hue performed during the record label's set.

2023
Coachella 2023 will be organized from April 14–16 and 21–23 featuring Bad Bunny, Blackpink, Frank Ocean as the headlining acts.

References

Coachella Valley Music and Arts Festival Lineups
Coachella Valley Music and Arts Festival Lineups
Annual events in Riverside County, California
Coachella Valley
Indio, California